HS Cepelin was founded 25 December 1995 in Cetinje, Montenegro. For its first 15 years of existence, 1030 boys and girls passed through HS Cepelin. The primary goal and task of the school is the creation of young players in handball sport.

All age categories (Young Pioneers, Old Pioneers, Cadets, Juniors and Seniors) attend the school.

History

The senior team competed in the Second National League of FR Yugoslavia group 'West', and in I and II Montenegrin league in the previous existence of the school. Cadets compete in the Cadets league of Montenegro. Juniors and pioneers compete in the junior and pioneer championships of Montenegro.

HS Cepelin has won many championships in Montenegro: the Younger Pioneers four times, the Older Pioneers six times, the Cadets four times, and the Juniors once. HS Cepelin won the championship of the FR Yugoslavia with Older Pioneers in 1999. Also, with the juniors team, HS “Cepelin-Lovćen osiguranje”, become Unofficial champion of Yugoslavia in 2002.

For the national team of Serbia and Montenegro, two of its players performed, and for national team of Montenegro 40 of its players performed so far.

Two latest exploits of the school made its cadets, who are under the name of “Budvanska Rivijera” (Cepelin) won 27 from a total of 28 games in season 2008/09, and won the Cadet league of Montenegro second time in a row in 2009/10, and thus once more confirmed that the best handball is played in Cetinje, in the handball school Cepelin.

From 1 September 2005. the handball fans have the opportunity to enroll their children in the handball school in Podgorica. Through the handball school in Podgorica now passed 174 children.

Thanks to its great potential and the number of players, HS Cepelin during the previous years was able to assist other handball clubs in Montenegro. Among these teams are: RK Lovćen from Cetinje, RK Mornar from the Bar, RK Boka from Tivat, RK Rudar from Pljevlja, RK Budvanska Rivijera from Budva. All of these clubs HS Cepelin is assisted in that its players played on double registration, so these clubs could achieve better results in the competitions.

Selections 

In the school exists, work and function all the age categories of players:

 Mini handball 
 Young pioneers 
 Old pioneers 
 Cadets 
 Juniors 
 Seniors 

Through natural and expertise way in selection of young players, the handball school should always add to the club the best students for their teams, who are able to compete in all ranks of Montenegrin handball leagues.

In this way, the handball school is able to create with their work, and provide to itself in every moment, the strongest selection for competition.

From September 2010 The HC Cepelin will begin its work on the Mini handball, for six-year-old children.

Trainers 

In addition to work in the creation of the young players of all categories, the school deals with the training on professional trainers. Each coach is daily involved in the training of students in all age categories (young pioneers, the old pioneers, cadets, juniors, seniors), which contributes to the excellent "sharpen eye" in the selection of players for the next age category, as well as the improvement of mental / physical / educational model which is applied in the education of students.

School handball Cepelin is known for its coaches, which are widely known and recognized. Thanks to its professional qualifications and great handball knowledge in working with young selections, trophies have become a regular thing that showcases the work of the school.

Each coach left a note in their own way to each student.

Four trainers work in handball school Cepelin:
 Miodrag-Miško Popović 
 Vasko Ćeranić 
 Dejan Vukčević 
 Blažo Popović

Trophies 

As a result of many years of hard and dedicated work, and high performance and criteria in playing handball, prizes and trophies comes as awards.

HC Ceppelin for its first 15 years of existence has won a large number of trophies and awards, both club and personal. This gallery represents all the trophies that are in its repository.

Friends of the club 

Handball school Cepelin does not have own financial sources, with which it could hold competition of the club who exists within the school.

Because of this, school is being financed through help of its friends and partners.

External links 
 Handball Federation of Montenegro
 balkan-handball

Cepelin
Handball clubs established in 1995
1995 establishments in Yugoslavia
Cetinje